Huang Yiling is the name of:

Huang Yee-ling (born 1969), Taiwanese singer
Huang Yi-ling (born 1985), Taiwanese sport shooter
Michelle Wong (born 1991), Singaporean actress